Scincella silvicola is a species of skink that lives in the southern Sierra Madre Oriental and northern Sierra Madre de Oaxaca of Mexico, from Puebla to Oaxaca. It occurs primarily in dry, scrubby areas and forests, especially pine forests. It is generally a common species and faces no major threats. It is most likely ovoviviparous.

Like all members of the genus Scincella, S. silvicola is long and cylindrical, with short limbs. Its color is light bronze or cream, and it has a dark stripe originating at the snout and running dorsolaterally across its body. Its maximum snout-vent length is about 53 millimeters.

References 

García-Vásquez, Uri, and Manuel Feria-Ortiz. "Skinks of Mexico." Reptilia No. 49: 74-79.

Scincella
Endemic reptiles of Mexico
Fauna of the Sierra Madre de Oaxaca
Fauna of the Sierra Madre Oriental
Reptiles described in 1937
Taxa named by Edward Harrison Taylor